Candalides xanthospilos, the yellow-spot blue, is a species of butterfly of the family Lycaenidae. It is found in along the eastern coast of Australia, including Queensland, New South Wales and Victoria.

The wingspan is about 25 mm. Adults are brown. Both sexes have a large yellow patch in the centre of each forewing. The underside is white with a row of black dots along the wing margins, two dots under the centre of each forewing and three dots under each hindwing.

The larvae have been recorded feeding on Pimelea species, including Pimelea colorans, Pimelea latifolia, Pimelea linifolia and Pimelea ligustrina. They are green with white hairs, dark green diagonal stripes, yellow lateral lines and a pale brown head. Pupation takes place in a brown pupa with a length of about 10 mm which is made in leaf debris at the base of the host plant.

References

Candalidini
Butterflies described in 1817